Thomas Nisbet (born 16 September 1955) is a Bahamian windsurfer. He competed in the Windglider event at the 1984 Summer Olympics.

References

1955 births
Living people
Bahamian male sailors (sport)
Bahamian windsurfers
Olympic sailors of the Bahamas
Sailors at the 1984 Summer Olympics – Windglider
Place of birth missing (living people)